Crooked Creek Township is one of eleven townships in Jasper County, Illinois, USA.  As of the 2010 census, its population was 721 and it contained 340 housing units.

Geography

Cities, towns, villages
 Hidalgo
 Rose Hill

Unincorporated towns
 Plainfield at 
 Point Pleasant at 
(This list is based on USGS data and may include former settlements.)

Adjacent townships
 Greenup Township, Cumberland County (north)
 Grandville Township (east)
 Hunt City Township (southeast)
 Wade Township (southwest)
 Grove Township (west)

Cemeteries
The township contains these sixteen cemeteries: Andrews, Aten, Brooks, Brown, Coad, Harrisburg, Hayes, Hidalgo, Hunt/Cummins, Kilgore, Plainfield, Ross, Songer, Swick, Swick Family and Ward.

Major highways
  Illinois Route 130

Demographics

School districts
 Cumberland Community Unit School District 77
 Jasper County Community Unit School District 1

Political districts
 Illinois' 19th congressional district
 State House District 108
 State Senate District 54

References
 
 United States Census Bureau 2007 TIGER/Line Shapefiles
 United States National Atlas

External links
 City-Data.com
 Illinois State Archives

Townships in Jasper County, Illinois
1859 establishments in Illinois
Populated places established in 1859
Townships in Illinois